Ek Hi Raasta ( Only One Way) is a 1977 Hindi-language drama film, produced and directed by Mohan Segal under the Uma Cine Films Pvt Ltd banner. It stars Jeetendra, Shabana Azmi,  and music composed by Rajesh Roshan.

Plot
Atin Singh (Jeetendra) son of Raja Kamal Nain Singh (Utpal Dutt), who is a Zamindar in name only, works as sales manager for an automobile company in Bombay, where he falls in love with Veena (Asha Sachdev), daughter of a multimillionaire, Mr. Chowdary (Om Shivpuri). Kamal Nain Singh who needs dowry money for his daughter's marriage, forces Atin's to marry another rich man's daughter Ketki (Shabana Azmi). After the marriage, Atin goes back to Bombay and convinces Veena that he will get a divorce from his wife so they can get married. When Atin goes back to the village to ask for the divorce, he consummates his marriage with Ketki, unintentionally.  The next day when he insists on a divorce, Ketki even signs the papers. However, when he is back in Bombay, Veena's father does not agree to her marriage with Atin. Ketki continues to stay with her in laws in the village and looks after them. She also gives birth to Atin's son (Master Inderjeet).

Years pass on as Ketki works as a school teacher and brings up her son Munna. Nirmal (Vinod Mehra) a colleague of Ketki, loves Munna as his own son. Kamal Nain Singh suggests that Ketki marry Nirmal. While Veena has left her father's house to marry Atin, he is not able to afford her the lifestyle she wants. Veena leaves him at the behest of a friend (Vikram) and later commits suicide when Vikram betrays her. Atin now realizes his mistake and goes back to the village. Nirmal helps bring about a reunion between Atin, Ketki and their son.

Cast
 Jeetendra 
 Shabana Azmi
 Vinod Mehra 
 Asha Sachdev
 Utpal Dutt
 Om Shivpuri
 Jagdeep 
 Indrani Mukherjee
 Master Inderjeet

Soundtrack

References

1970s Hindi-language films
Films scored by Rajesh Roshan